"Give Me Forty Acres (To Turn This Rig Around)" is a single by American country music group The Willis Brothers. Released in 1964, it was the first single from their album Give Me Forty Acres. The song peaked at number 9 on the Billboard Hot Country Singles chart. It also reached number 1 on the RPM Country Tracks chart in Canada.

Chart performance

References

1964 singles
The Willis Brothers songs
1964 songs
Starday Records singles